Roach may refer to:

Animals
 Cockroach, various insect species of the order Blattodea
 Common roach (Rutilus rutilus), a fresh and brackish water fish of the family Cyprinidae
 Rutilus or roaches, a genus of fishes
 California roach (Hesperoleucus symmetricus), a cyprinid fish native to western North America

Places
 Roach, Missouri, an unincorporated community
 Roach, Nevada, a ghost town
 Roach, West Virginia, an unincorporated community
 Roach River (Maine), a river in Piscataquis County
 Roach River (Virginia), a tributary of the North Fork Rivanna River
 River Roach, Essex, England
 Roach, former name of the Rural Municipality of Leroy No. 339, Saskatchewan, Canada

People
 Roach (surname), a list of people who bear the last name Roach
 Roach (rapper) (born 1988), American rapper and hip-hop artist
 Roach, fictional character in the animated series Supernoobs
 Gary "Roach" Sanderson, a playable character in Call of Duty: Modern Warfare 2 
 Roach Stewart (1881–1948), college football player and attorney
Roach, a fictional character from the 1991 crime-action film, Point Break
 Law Roach

Other
 A Zerg unit in StarCraft 2
 Roach (headdress), traditional Native American headdress usually of porcupine hair
 Roach (sail), an arc of extra material on the leech of a sail
 Roach (smoking), the butt of a marijuana cigarette
 Roaching, a way of styling the mane of a horse
 Roach back, a type of conformation of the back of a horse
 Roach Stone, a type of Portland stone with many shell fragments within the stone
 Roach v Electoral Commissioner, a landmark 2007 High Court of Australia case

See also
 Roaches (disambiguation)
 Roache, the surname of several actors
 Dace, several species of small fish
 Shiner (fish), several species of small fish
 

Animal common name disambiguation pages